Isophrictis is a genus of moths in the family Gelechiidae.

Species

Isophrictis actiella Barnes & Busck, 1920
Isophrictis actinopa Meyrick, 1929
Isophrictis anteliella (Busck, 1903)
Isophrictis anthemidella (Wocke, 1871)
Isophrictis canicostella (Walsingham, 1888)
Isophrictis cerdanica Nel, 1995
Isophrictis cilialineella (Chambers, 1874)
Isophrictis constantina (Baker, 1888)
Isophrictis corsicella Amsel, 1936
Isophrictis dietziella (Busck, 1903)
Isophrictis impugnata Gozmany, 1957
Isophrictis invisella (Constant, 1885)
Isophrictis kefersteiniellus (Zeller, 1850)
Isophrictis lineatellus (Zeller, 1850)
Isophrictis magnella (Busck, 1903)
Isophrictis meridionella (Herrich-Schäffer, 1854)
Isophrictis microlina Meyrick, 1935
Isophrictis modesta (Walsingham, 1888)
Isophrictis occidentalis Braun, 1925
Isophrictis oudianella (Lucas, 1942)
Isophrictis pallidastrigella (Chambers, 1874)
Isophrictis pallidella (Chambers, 1874)
Isophrictis pennella (Busck, 1907)
Isophrictis robinella (Chretien, 1907)
Isophrictis rudbeckiella Bottimer, 1926
Isophrictis sabulella (Walsingham, 1888)
Isophrictis similiella (Chambers, 1872)
Isophrictis striatella (Denis & Schiffermuller, 1775)
Isophrictis tophella (Walsingham, 1888)
Isophrictis trimaculella (Chambers, 1874)

References

 , 2010: The gelechiid fauna of the southern Ural Mountains, part I: descriptions of seventeen new species (Lepidoptera: Gelechiidae). Zootaxa 2366: 1-34. Abstract: http://www.mapress.com/zootaxa/2010/f/z02366p034f.pdf].
 ; ;  2009: Checklist of Gelechiidae (Lepidoptera) in America North of Mexico. Zootaxa, 2231: 1-39. Abstract & excerpt

 
Isophrictini
Taxa named by Edward Meyrick